Hemisinus is a genus of freshwater snails with an operculum, aquatic gastropod mollusks in the family Hemisinidae.

Species 
Species within the genus Hemisinus include:
 Hemisinus brevis 
 Hemisinus cubanianus
 Hemisinus lineolatus

References 

Hemisinidae